In the ancient Japanese government,  was the inspection of documents submitted to the tennō (emperor), or the position held by those who performed the inspection. 

References

Classical Japan